Dick Brennan is an American journalist. He is an anchor and reporter for WCBS-TV in New York City. Previously, He also co-anchors the News At Nine on CBS2's sister station WLNY, with Alice Gainer.  Previously, he was Chief Political Correspondent for Fox 5 News in New York City, and He currently co-anchors CBS 2 News At 6:00 With Dana Tyler.

Before appearing on-camera, Dick was a producer for radio personality Bruce Williams, WWOR-TV and WNBC-TV. After anchoring and reporting at UPN-9, now known as MY-9, Brennan made the switch to Fox's flagship WNYW as an anchor and reporter.
Brennan is the winner of numerous awards, and recently collected another EMMY Award for his CBS2'S coverage of Super-storm Sandy.
He grew up in Queens, attended Archbishop Molloy High School, and then, in 1983, graduated from Fordham University in the Bronx.
Brennan lives in New York, and is married with two daughters.

Brennan made a cameo appearance on the eighth season of 24, playing himself in two episodes. He also appeared in an episode of Sex and the City.

References

External links

American television journalists
1969 births
Living people
Television anchors from New York City
Gabelli School of Business alumni
American male journalists
20th-century American journalists